Uloborus georgicus is a spider species found in Georgia.

See also 
 List of Uloboridae species

References

External links 

Uloboridae
Spiders of Europe
Spiders of Georgia (country)
Spiders described in 1997